The women's individual archery event at the 2016 Summer Olympics was held from 5 to 13 August at the Sambadrome Marquês de Sapucaí in Rio de Janeiro, Brazil. One of four archery events as part of the 2016 Olympic catalogue of sports, it was the fourteenth time a women's individual competition was contested as a discipline at the Olympic Games. Forty different nations qualified for the event, sending a total of sixty-four archers to compete. The defending Olympic champion was Ki Bo-bae of South Korea.

South Korea's three archers were tipped for success, the nation having won all but one of the event's gold medals since the 1984 Summer Olympics. Ki and her South Korean teammates Choi Mi-sun and Chang Hye-jin dominated the initial ranking round and secured the top three seeds for the elimination rounds, entering the knockout phase having also won gold medal in the women's team event. Choi, who entered ranked as the world's number one archer, was however eliminated in the quarter-finals by Alejandra Valencia of Mexico; world number two Tan Ya-ting of Chinese Taipei, another favourite for the gold medal, also fell at the same stage. Chang defeated Ki in the semi-finals and went on to face Germany's Lisa Unruh in the final, defeating the German to claim her second gold medal of the Games. In the bronze medal match Ki beat Valencia to win her fourth career Olympic medal.

Chang's gold medal victory continued South Korea's near-domination of the event. Archery became South Korea's most successful Olympic discipline, while Unruh's silver medal gave Germany its first Olympic archery medal in sixteen years.

Background

The women's individual event has been held as part of every Summer Olympics archery programme since the reintroduction of the sport at the 1972 Games in Munich; individual competitions for women had also previously been held at the 1904 and 1908 Summer Olympics. Heading into the Rio 2016 event archers from South Korea had been the most successful overall with seven gold medal victories, success coming particularly from the 1984 Summer Olympics onwards. The United States were ranked second in number of gold medals with four, with Great Britain, the Soviet Union and China having won one apiece.

At the previous Olympic Games held at Lord's Cricket Ground in London, Ki Bo-bae won the gold medal, reclaiming the Olympic title for South Korea after Zhang Juanjuan's victory on home soil at the 2008 Beijing Olympics interrupted a six-time winning streak for South Korea in the women's individual discipline. Ki had narrowly defeated Mexico's Aída Román in a one-arrow shoot-off in the final, earning her a second Olympic gold medal following victory in the women's team event four days earlier. Román and her Mexican teammate Mariana Avitia, who had defeated Khatuna Lorig of the United States in the bronze medal match, became Mexico's first ever Olympic medal-winners in archery.

An official test event, the Aquece Rio International Archery Challenge, was held over eight days at the Sambadrome Marquês de Sapucaí in September 2015. The purpose of the event was to evaluate the venue's preparations and give archers and coaches the chance to familiarise themselves with the location and schedule ahead of the Games the following year. South Korea's Choi Mi-sun emerged victorious in the women's individual event by defeating Tan Ya-ting of Chinese Taipei in the final, with Mackenzie Brown of the United States third and Japan's Kaori Kawanaka finishing in fourth.

Qualification

Sixty-four places were available for the event with each National Olympic Committee (NOC) represented by a maximum of three archers. Thirty-three of these places were open for the eleven nations qualifying for the Olympic women's team event, the 2015 World Archery Championships' women's team recurve event held in Copenhagen acting as the primary qualifying tournament in awarding twenty-four places. Eight nations - China, Colombia, Georgia, India, Japan, South Korea, Mexico, and Russia - secured the maximum berth of archers as the highest-placed teams. The remaining three team entries were decided at the Final Qualification Tournament held as part of the third stage of the 2016 Archery World Cup in Antalya, with Italy, Chinese Taipei, and Ukraine securing the final three-woman positions. As the host of the 2016 Olympics, Brazil automatically qualified three places as the twelfth team nation.

The NOCs that were unsuccessful in winning a three-member team entry were each limited to qualifying one archer. Of the twenty-eight remaining qualification positions, eight were awarded to the NOCs of the highest-ranked archers at the 2015 World Archery Championships women's individual recurve event, fourteen to those at a series of qualifying tournaments organised by the continental archery federations, and three to those at the Final Qualification Tournament in Antalya. The final three places were awarded to NOCs that entered fewer than eight athletes in individual disciplines at the 2008 and 2012 Summer Olympics, the motivation being seek to increase representation from non-traditional archery nations as well as abiding by the universal representation ethos of the Olympic Charter. The three NOCs selected were Bangladesh, Bhutan, and Myanmar.

National selections

With the qualification positions for the Olympic event awarded to the NOCs of the successful archers, rather than the archers themselves, each NOC was free to choose its representatives through its own selection procedure. Defending Olympic champion Ki was chosen alongside Olympic debutants Choi Mi-sun and Chang Hye-jin to head the South Korean squad. The three had placed highest in the Korean national team selection competition which concluded in April 2016, Chang beating Kang Chae-young into third-place having narrowly missed out on Olympic selection four years earlier. Aída Román, the silver medalist from the 2012 Olympics, was joined by Gabriela Bayardo and 2011 Pan American Games champion Alejandra Valencia to spearhead the Mexican team, with London 2012 bronze medalist Mariana Avitia failing to rank highly enough in the national selection procedure to contest a third Olympic Games.

Several nations selected experienced Olympians. Great Britain's Naomi Folkard and Georgia's Khatuna Narimanidze and Kristine Esebua were all chosen to compete in their fourth Games, while Greece's selection of Evangelia Psarra made her the most experienced Olympian in the field, Psarra contesting her fifth consecutive Olympic Games. The Chinese Taipei team featured one change from its London 2012 trio, Lin Shih-chia joining Tan Ya-ting and Le Chien-ying in what journalist John Stanley described as a "formidable" line-up. Russia too made just one change, retaining Ksenia Perova and Inna Stepanova from their 2012 team and picking Tuyana Dashidorzhieva as their third entrant. Following the publication of the McLaren Report concerning allegations of state-sponsored doping of Russian athletes, the trio were approved and cleared to compete by the World Archery Federation in July 2016 having had no history of using performance-enhancing drugs.

India also selected two athletes from its 2012 squad for its three-woman contingent, former youth world champion Deepika Kumari and Laishram Bombayla Devi partnering Olympic newcomer Laxmirani Majhi in the country's latest attempt to secure its first Olympic archery medal. In contrast, Italy's team of three was entirely new, Guendalina Sartori captaining the squad after the retirement of six-time Olympian Natalia Valeeva. Brazil likewise featured three Olympic debutantes in its lineup, the performances Ane Marcelle dos Santos, Sarah Nikitin, and Marina Canetta in the second and third stages of the 2016 Archery World Cup meriting their selection for the host nation.

Australia, Canada, and the United States were among those to send first-time Olympians as their sole representatives. Alice Ingley was promoted from her reserve role at the 2012 Olympics having shown good form at team selection camps, while Mackenzie Brown beat four-time Olympian Khatuna Lorig to victory at the US women's trials to secure her first Olympic berth. Canada nominated Georcy-Stéphanie Picard, who had previously represented her country at the 2015 Pan American Games. Zahra Nemati, the reigning Paralympic champion in the W1/W2 wheelchair discipline, was selected by Iran for her Olympic debut following her silver medal at the 2018 Asian Archery Championships. Nemati entered as the only archer competing in both the 2016 Summer Olympics and Paralympics.

Format

The women's individual was an outdoor target archery event using recurve bows. Held under World Archery-approved rules, archers shot at a 122 cm-wide target from a distance of 70 metres, each arrow earning between one and ten points depending on how close it landed to the centre of the target. The competition comprised an initial ranking round, five elimination rounds, and two finals matches which decided the winners of the gold, silver, and bronze medals. In the ranking round, which took place on 5 August, each of the 64 archers entering the competition shot a total of 72 arrows. The total score of each archer was used to seed the archers into the following five-round single-elimination tournament, the highest-scoring archer receiving the number one seed. If two or more archers finished with the same total score, the number of arrows shot in the central 10-ring on the target was used as a tie-breaker. If two or more archers were still tied, then the number of arrows shot within the inner-10 ring determined the finishing positions. If the archers still could still not be separated then a disk toss was to be employed to decide the final order.

The elimination rounds and medal matches, held over four days from 8 to 11 August, used the Archery Olympic Round set system introduced at the 2012 Summer Olympics. Each match consisted of a maximum of five sets, with archers each shooting three arrows per set. The archer with the best score from their three arrows won the set, earning two set points. The archer with the lowest score in each set received zero set points. If the score was tied, each archer received one set point. The first archer to set six points was declared the winner. If the match was tied at five set points apiece after the maximum five sets were played, each archer shot one more arrow with the one shooting closest to centre of the target winning.

Schedule

Report

Pre-event

With South Korea's long-established record of success in the women's individual event, the trio of Ki Bo-bae, Chang Hye-jin, and Choi Mi-sun entered as favourites to challenge for the gold medal. Ki and Choi in particular were tipped for victory by several observers, including commentator George Tekmitchov, compound archer Sara Lopez, and World Archery journalist Andrea Vasquez. Jane Zorowitz of NBC predicted that Choi was Ki's biggest obstacle to retaining her Olympic title.

Others favoured those outside the South Korean team. Former Olympians Juan René Serrano and Natalia Valeeva picked Aída Román and Deepika Kumari as their favourites, whereas broadcaster Carl Arky selected Chinese Taipei's Tan Ya-ting as his choice for gold medal. Zorowitz also listed Tan and her teammate Lei Chien-ying as serious medal challengers, while Vinica Weiss of Sports Illustrated called Ksenia Perova as one of her athletes to watch. Peter Rutherford of Reuters further suggested that the rising number of archery teams employing Korean coaches in an attempt to emulate South Korea's track record would increase the number of contenders for the Olympic crown.

Ranking round
The event began on the afternoon of Friday 5 August with the 72-arrow ranking round. Choi topped the leaderboard with a score of 669 points out of a maximum of 720, beating teammates Chang Hye-jin and Ki Bo-bae, who ranked second and third with 666 and 663 points respectively. By earning the top three seeds for the elimination rounds the trio delayed any potential intra-team match-ups until the semi-finals at the earliest. Choi had begun the round strongly and was on course to surpass Lina Herasymenko's twenty-year-old Olympic record of 673 points. Breezy conditions however intervened mid-way through the round, affecting her aiming and halting her progress. Speaking afterwards Choi commented that despite the weather she was happy with the performances of both herself and her teammates, saying "[w]e have the best players, we have talent and skill. It’s so windy that people can get overwhelmed, but we (did) well in the end."

Citing a busy schedule, the Indian archers elected to skip the opening ceremony, which took place later in the evening of 5 August, to fully concentrate on the ranking round. Deepika Kumari and Bombayla Devi Laishram both made promising starts that afternoon, and by the halfway point Kumari was placed fifth and Laishram had risen as high as eighth. Inconsistent shooting from both however saw them fall away from the leaders over the final thirty-six arrows, Kumari concluding the round in 20th place with 640 points, while Laishram finished four places below on 638 points. The Indo-Asian News Service however summarised the Olympic debut of Laxmirani Majhi, the third member of the Indian team, as "disappointing", Mahji ending on 614 points in 43rd place.

For the three Italian archers, Michele Cassano of OA Sport was optimistic in his analysis of the potential match-ups to come following Lucilla Boari's seventh-placed finish with 651 points, but was more ambivalent about thirteenth-seed Guendalina Sartori, whose path to the latter stages of the competition included Kumari and Georgia's Kristine Esebua. He however likened Claudia Mandia's path to the circles of hell in Dante's Inferno, the Italian scoring 612 points to finish forty-sixth and entering the elimination rounds in the same bracket as Mackenzie Brown, Finland's Taru Kuoppa, and reigning Olympic champion Ki.

Elimination rounds   
After a two-day break over the weekend, in which the men's and women's team events were contested, the women's individual competition resumed on the morning of Monday 8 August for the beginning of the elimination rounds. Held concurrently with the same stages of the men's individual competition, the 1/32 and 1/16 eliminations lasted until Wednesday 10 August, while the women's 1/16 round took place on the morning of Thursday 11 August.

8 August
 
Monday saw Ki in action, the defending champion winning her first two matches without dropping a set to advance to the last sixteen against Myanmar's San Yu Htwe. Hwte, who entered the competition through Myanmar's invitational place and was seeded fifty-first after the ranking round, pulled off two surprise results in a row by defeating both fourteenth-seed Taru Kuoppa and nineteenth-seed Mackenzie Brown, conceding just one set in each match. Ki's opponent in the final at the 2012 Olympics, Aída Román, was also in action but failed replicate her silver medal-winning run from 2012, losing to Moldova's Alexandra Mîrca in the 1/32 elimination round. Despite being seeded eleven places lower than Mîrca, the Mexican's loss was still regarded as an upset by Notimex, who concluded that her performance at the Games fell below expectations. Román cited the wind as her biggest difficulty on a day that saw greater wind gusts than on the previous day.

Seventh-seed Lucilla Boari was another archer to suffer a surprise opening-round defeat on the Monday, losing to the Australian fifty-eighth seed Alice Ingley in the day's afternoon session. Boari's defeat was the second endured by an Italian archer that day, Mandia having earlier succumbed to Mackenzie Brown in the 1/32 elimination round. Francesco Lionetti of the Italian website Sportface blamed the defeats on the mood of disappointment in the Italian camp, which stemmed from Boari, Mandia, and Sartori having narrowly missed out on a bronze medal against Chinese Taipei in the women's team event the day before. Ingley was herself eliminated later in her second match of the day against Brazil's Ane Marcelle dos Santos. The Brazilian had earlier defeated Saori Nagamine of Japan, breaking down in tears as the home crowd gave her a standing ovation.

9 August
The second day of the elimination rounds on Tuesday 9 August saw fewer surprise results. Jane Zorowitz of NBC summarised that the day saw "no huge upsets, and for the most part, those whom were believed to move on to the next rounds did." Iran's Zahra Nemati, the sole Paralympian in the competition, had the support of the crowd in her opening bout against Russia's Inna Stepanova, but despite a strong start ultimately lost by six set points to two. Speaking to the media after the match, Nemati described the Olympic competition as a far more stressful experience than that of the Paralympics. Stepanova advanced to meet fellow Russian Ksenia Perova in the 1/16 elimination round, Stepanova defeating her compatriot in the all-Russian tie by seven set points to three to progress into the last sixteen.

11 August
The elimination rounds concluded on 11 August. By reaching the last sixteen Ane Marcelle dos Santos achieved the host nation's highest ever finish in an Olympic archery competition achieving ninth place in the tournament's final standings. Naomi Folkard of Great Britain also achieved her personal best in reaching the quarter-finals on her fourth attempt. The quarter-finals also saw a major upset with the elimination of world number one Choi to the eighth seed Alejandra Valencia of Mexico, the Mexican winning in straight sets. Choi failed to recover after scoring only a five with her first arrow of the match, commenting afterwards that "I couldn't focus on myself today."

Choi's teammates Chang and Ki each won in their brackets to meet in the semifinals. As the defending champion Ki was the favourite to advance to the final, but Chang overcame a poor start - which included scoring a three with her second arrow - to win in five sets and progress to the final, ending Ki's hopes of becoming the first female archer to retain her individual Olympic title. Chang was joined in the gold medal match by Lisa Unruh of Germany, the reigning World Archery Indoor Champion. Unruh was a surprise finalist and later admitted she had had a disappointing ranking round in finishing 21st overall. Nevertheless, after three wins in the first three elimination rounds she defied expectations in the later rounds and defeated fourth-seed and world number two Tan Ya-ting in the quarter-finals and Alejandra Valencia in the semi-finals to reach the gold medal final.

Medal matches

As the two losing semi-finalists, Ki met Valencia in the bronze medal match, the latter shooting for Mexico's first medal of the Games. Ki however prevailed in four sets to earn her fourth career Olympic medal, the second highest tally for a South Korean archer after Kim Soo-nyung's six medals won between 1988 and 2000. Valencia nevertheless earned her highest finishing position in an world competition to date with fourth overall.

In the gold medal final Chang and Unruh each started well, winning one of the opening two sets apiece. Chang won the third set after Unruh faltered by shooting a seven, claiming the fourth set shortly afterwards by scoring two tens and a nine that Unruh could not overcome, earning Chang the victory and her first Olympic medal. The Associated Press praised Chang as a "pillar of consistency" amid wind gusts that made aiming difficult.

Chang's win was her second gold medal of the 2016 Olympics following South Korea's success in the women's team competition earlier in the week; she became the eighth female South Korean archer to win an Olympic gold medal in an individual event. It was also South Korea's third gold medal of the Games and the nation's twenty-second Olympic archery gold medal overall, overtaking the twenty-one gold medals earned in short track speed skating at the Winter Olympics to become the country's most successful Olympic sport. Chang's two gold medals earned her the top female athlete prize at the 2016 Korea Woman Sports Awards.

Unruh's silver medal was Germany's first ever individual archery Olympic medal, and Germany's first archery medal since the German women's team won bronze at the 2000 Summer Olympics.

Records
70 metres - 72 arrow ranking round

The world record score for a 72-arrow round had been improved since the 2012 Summer Olympics, with Ki Bo-bae setting a new record score during the women's individual recurve event at the 2015 Summer Universiade in Gwangju. Ki's total of 686 surpassed the previous highest tally set by compatriot Park Sung-hyun by four points, breaking a record that had stood for more than 10 years. The Olympic record score of 673 was set by Ukraine's Lina Herasymenko at the 1996 Summer Olympics and was later matched by Park at the 2008 Summer Olympics.

Neither record was broken at the 2016 Olympics.

Results

Ranking round

Elimination rounds

Section 1

Section 2

Section 3

Section 4

Note: A superscript denotes a win from a one-arrow shoot-off
Source:

Finals

Source:

References

External links
 2016 Olympic Games at World Archery
 Video replay of the final rounds at Olympic.org

Archery at the 2016 Summer Olympics
2016 in women's archery
Women's events at the 2016 Summer Olympics